The  is an old stone tomb in the grounds of Nagoya Castle in central Japan.

History 
The tomb is a Japanese kofun, consisting of an empty stone chamber where someone originally was laid to rest. The chamber consists of roughly hewn, large slabs of stone pieced together and capped with a heavy stone roof. The entrance to the chamber was chiseled into the rock.

The kofun is located on the grounds of the Ofukemaru of Nagoya Castle. In 1988, experts were able to determine that the tomb must have originally come from what is today Shimane Prefecture, or ancient Izumo Province. The exact original location of the tomb cannot however be determined since most of the areas in question are today used for agriculture. Shimane Prefecture is about 500 kilometres to the west of Nagoya. How and when the tomb was transported to Nagoya Castle and what purpose it served there is unknown. It could be that the tomb was reused as a storage chamber, however that remains speculation.

External links 

Kofun
Buildings and structures in Nagoya
Buildings and structures in Shimane Prefecture